Black Laundry (Kvisa Shchora) is a  lesbian, gay, bisexual, transgender, and  queer (LGBTQ) organization that uses direct action to oppose Israeli occupation of Palestinian land and advocate for social justice. The group made its first public appearance in 2001 after the second Intifada, where 250 members marched in the Tel Aviv Pride Day parade with the message 'No Pride in Occupation.'   

Co-founder Dali Baurn, an activist and professor at the Community School for Women, created Black Laundry to focus on creating a community that advocates social justice for women and queer community by using feminist theory and working with both Palestinians and Israelis. 

According to their website, "Black Laundry tries to stress the connection between different forms of oppression - our own oppression as lesbians, gays and transpeople enhances our solidarity with members of other oppressed groups."

See also
 International Solidarity Movement
 Israeli–Palestinian conflict
 Refusenik

References

This page is seeded with information from infoshop.org's OpenWiki
 Katz, Sue, "What's Left of the Left in Israel", Z Magazine, December 2004, 16-19.
 " Interview: Israeli Anarchism – Being Young, Queer, and Radical in the Promised Land", Infoshop News

External links 
 Official website

Non-governmental organizations involved in the Israeli–Palestinian conflict
Political organizations based in Israel
LGBT political advocacy groups in Israel
LGBT anarchism
Anarchist organizations in Israel
Anarchist culture
Queer organizations